Jin Feibao (born November 23, 1963) is a Chinese mountain climber. He has been described as "arguably modern China's greatest adventurer." A native from Kunming, Feibao has completed the Explorers Grand Slam, summiting the highest mountain in every continent and reaching both the North and South Poles in a record 18 months and 24 days. He has also trekked across the Sahara Desert and took part in the first Chinese expedition to cross Greenland from West to East. On top of his many explorations, he is also a celebrated stamp collector, having collected the Guinness Book of World Records largest Olympic stamp collection, and the largest collection of stamps featuring birds. 
His recent achievement is the Fairyland 100 Marathon, he successfully finished a big challenge - to run 100 marathons in 100 consecutive days in 100 beautiful countryside places in Yunnan, Southeast China.

Explorers Grand Slam 

On May 14, 2006, Jin Feibao, along with his brother Jin Feibiao, became the first brothers to summit Mount Everest together. At the summit they flew the Chinese flag along with the Olympic flag to show their support of the upcoming 2008 Beijing Olympics. After summiting Everest, Feibao continued to climb the highest mountain in each of the seven continents as well as trek to the North and South Poles, raising the Olympic flag at each site. On December 8, 2007, summited Mount Aconcagua in South America becoming the fastest person to complete the Explorers Grand Slam in just under 19 months.

Exhibitions 

In 2004, in collaboration with American Gregg Millett, Feibao hosted the exhibition "1944: Colorful Kunming" which featured the oldest known color photographs ever taken in China, some 200 color slides taken by a US Army Lieutenant in World War II. The exhibition was an immediate hit. It was free to the public and over 300,000 people attended in the two weeks that it was on display. The exhibition put Feibao in the city spotlight, and he used the popularity of the exhibition to jump start his adventures and fulfill his passions.

April 25, 2008: Organize “A hundred years of Olympic Games” – 2008 Kunming “Olympic Spirit” World collected Olympic stamps exhibition. 
July 20, 2008: Organize “A hundred years of Yunnan Baiyao Co., Polar expedition”—2008 “The first Chinese trekking through Greenland Icecap in North Pole” photo exhibition.

Other activities 

January 30, 2018 to February 5: took part in 2018 World Marathon Challenge, run seven marathons of seven continents all over the world
https://worldmarathonchallenge.com/results/

May 29, 2018 to August 26: successfully finished the challenge “Fairyland 100 Marathon” - run 100 marathons in 100 consecutive days in 100 beautiful countryside places in Yunnan, Southeast China.
https://www.gokunming.com/en/blog/item/4178/yunnans-native-son-jin-feibao-completes-100-marathons-in-100-days

Marathon and cross-country races 
October 31, 2010: Athens Classic Marathon

February 26, 2012: Tokyo Marathon

June 2012: Lanzhou Marathon

November 24, 2012: Beijing Marathon

December 2, 2012: Shanghai Marathon

January 5, 2013: Xiamen Marathon

April 15, 2013: Boston Marathon

June 1 to June 8, 2013: 4 Deserts Gobi March

September 29, 2013: BMW Berlin Marathon 2013

October 9 to December, 2013: New York Marathon, Chicago Marathon, Columbia Marathon, Atlantic Marathon

December 1, 2013: Standard Chartered Singapore Marathon 2013

February 10 to 24, 2014: 4 Deserts Saraha Race

March 21, 2014: Seoul International Marathon

April 21, 2014: Took part in and successfully finished 2014 Boston Marathon.
May 15 to June 2, 2014: Took part in and successfully finished Tenzing Hillary Everest Marathon in Nepal.

June 8, 2014: Took part in and successfully finished Laguna Phuket international Marathon in Thailand.

July 6, 2014: finished Golden Coast Airport Marathon in Australia.

August 28 to September 7, 2014: Took part in and successfully finished RacingThePlanet Madagascar 2014, 250 km, 7 days, self-supported endurance footrace.

October 5 to October 12, 2014: Took part in and successfully finished Atacama Crossing 2014, 250 km, 7 days, self-supported tough footrace, one of the 4 Deserts Series of RacingThePlanet.

November 1 to November 11, 2014: Took part in and successfully finished The Last Desert (Antarctic) 2014, 250 km, 7 days, self-supported tough footrace, one of the 4 Deserts Series of RacingThePlanet.

April 26, 2015: Took part in and successfully finished London Marathon.

November 18, 2015: Took part in and successfully finished Marathon International du Beaujolais in France.
December 18, 2015: Took part in and successfully finished Chiang Mai Marathon in Thailand.

December 2015: over two years endeavor, Jin Feibao completed the extreme marathons of seven continents, which made him the first person who completed the Explorers Grand Slam and the marathons of all continents.

March 2016: Took part in and successfully finished Bhutan Marathon.

April 16, 2016: Took part in and successfully finished Saipan Marathon

May 1, 2016: Took part in and successfully finished Borneo International Marathon in Malaysia.

May 29, 2016: Took part in and successfully finished Rio de Janeiro International Marathon in Brazil.

January 30, 2018 to February 5: took part in 2018 World Marathon Challenge, run seven marathons of seven continents all over the world, and finally completed the world challenge with the best result of “China’s Team of Dream”

Awards and honors 
Olympic Torch bearer, June 11, 2008 
Awarded China's Golden Rhinoceros Outdoor Award, 2006, 2007

References

External links 
 More on Jin Feibao
 Jin Feibao's website (in Chinese)
 Ghana News on Crossing the Sahara
 "Hiker's Guide to the Galaxy," China Daily
 Feibao on UNEP
 Space Training
 Kunming Company and NGO

1963 births
Chinese mountain climbers
Chinese summiters of Mount Everest
Summiters of the Seven Summits
Living people
Sportspeople from Kunming